WBCR-LP is a low power FM radio station with office and studio located in Great Barrington, Massachusetts, broadcasting on the 97.7 FM frequency. The organization's legal name is "Berkshire Community Radio Alliance," and is also known as "Berkshire Community Radio" or "BCR."

WBCR-LP is a 501(c)(3) non-profit, volunteer-run, non-commercial, community radio station with over 70 locally produced shows currently on the air. With a broadcast radius between 8 and 15 miles, depending on terrain, it serves the southern portion of Berkshire County, Massachusetts. WBCR-LP also streams live on the internet.

History
WBCR-LP commenced broadcasting on October 23, 2004.

Full power upgrade
On March 31, 2010, the Federal Communications Commission (FCC) granted the licensee of WBCR-LP, Berkshire Community Radio Alliance, a construction permit for 89.5 MHz from the  American Towers communications tower in Hillsdale, New York. When built, the station would have run 550 watts vertical from 144 meters above average terrain. However, in March 2013 the Board of Directors voted to remain as a low power station and turned the construction permit over to NEPR (New England Public Radio) which then constructed WNNU, basically an all news and talk station.

See also
List of community radio stations in the United States

References

External links
WBCR-LP Homepage
 

BCR-LP
Community radio stations in the United States
BCR-LP
Great Barrington, Massachusetts
Mass media in Berkshire County, Massachusetts
Radio stations established in 2004